An irregular matrix, or ragged matrix, is a matrix that has a different number of elements in each row. Ragged matrices are not used in linear algebra, since standard matrix transformations cannot be performed on them, but they are useful as arrays in computing. Irregular matrices are typically stored using Iliffe vectors.

For example, the following is an irregular matrix:

See also 

 Regular matrix (disambiguation)
 Empty matrix
 Sparse matrix
 Jagged array

References
 Paul E. Black, Ragged matrix, from Dictionary of Algorithms and Data Structures, Paul E. Black, ed., NIST, 2004.

Arrays
Matrices